Nigel Foster may refer to:

Nigel Foster (pianist), English piano accompanist
Nigel Foster (kayaker) (born 1952), English sea kayaker